Kryl may refer to:
 Kryl, Lubusz Voivodeship, a settlement in Western Poland
 Bohumir (Bohumír) Kryl, Czech-American Concert band leader and top cornet soloist.
 Karel Kryl, a Czech songwriter known for his criticism of the Communist regime

See also 

Karyl